The Finnish Air Force Band (Finnish: Ilmavoimien soittokunta, AALTO) is the official representative band of the Finnish Air Force serving from its headquarters in the northernmost city of Tikkakoski. The band operates in the area of the Luonetjärvi garrison in Jyväskylä. The 21-member band is led by Senior Conductor Juha Ketola. It was established in 1977 as the Luonetjärvi Varuskuntasoititunta. In 1990, the band was transferred under the command of the Air Force Academy, Finnish Air Force and was given its current title of Finnish Air Force Band. When marching on parade, the unit performs as a wind band. The band is one of the only bands in the Finnish Defence Force to maintain a fanfare team.

Ensembles
The following six units are ensembles of the air force band:

 Air Force Parade Band
 Air Force Big Band
 Air Force Wind Band
 Air Force Brass Quintet
 Air Force Groove Band
 Air Force Jazz Combo

Discography
The band has released the following albums:

Air Play (m1980)
Boat Singing and Playing (1981)
Hallport (1981)
Iltenna (1996)
Black Flag Combines with Jokilaakso Singers and Petter Ohls (2000)
Karelia misses ... together with Jokilaakso Singers and Petter Ohls (2004) and
Heart in Finland (2008).
Waves / Waves (2016)
KAJO (2017)

References

Links
The band in 1983

1977 establishments in Finland
Finnish Air Force
Finnish military bands
Air force bands
Musical groups established in 1977